Adie syndrome, also known as Holmes-Adie syndrome, is a neurological disorder characterized by a tonically dilated pupil that reacts slowly to light but shows a more definite response to  accommodation (i.e., light-near dissociation). It is frequently seen in females with absent knee or ankle jerks and impaired sweating. It is a rare condition and is estimated to affect approximately 1 in 1,000 individuals. The exact cause of Adie Syndrome is unknown, but it is believed to be related to a viral or bacterial infection, autoimmune disorders, or trauma.

The syndrome is caused by damage to the postganglionic fibers of the parasympathetic innervation of the eye, usually by a viral or bacterial infection that causes inflammation, and affects the pupil of the eye and the autonomic nervous system. It is named after the British neurologists William John Adie and Gordon Morgan Holmes, who independently described the same disease in 1931.

Signs and symptoms
Adie syndrome presents with three hallmark symptoms, namely at least one abnormally dilated pupil (mydriasis) which does not constrict in response to light, loss of deep tendon reflexes, and abnormalities of sweating. Other signs may include hyperopia due to accommodative paresis, photophobia and difficulty reading. Some individuals with Adie syndrome may also have cardiovascular abnormalities.

Pathophysiology
Pupillary symptoms of Holmes–Adie syndrome are thought to be the result of a viral or bacterial infection that causes inflammation and damage to neurons in the ciliary ganglion, located in the posterior orbit, that provides parasympathetic control of eye constriction. Additionally, patients with Holmes-Adie Syndrome can also experience problems with autonomic control of the body. This second set of symptoms is caused by damage to the dorsal root ganglia of the spinal cord. Adie's pupil is supersensitive to ACh so a muscarinic agonist (e.g. pilocarpine) whose dose would not be able to cause pupillary constriction in a normal patient, would cause it in a patient with Adie's Syndrome. The circuitry for the pupillary constriction does not descend below the upper midbrain, henceforth impaired pupillary constriction is extremely important to detect as it can be an early sign of brainstem herniation.

Diagnosis
Clinical exam may reveal sectoral paresis of the iris sphincter or vermiform iris movements. The tonic pupil may become smaller (miotic) over time which is referred to as "little old Adie's". Testing with low dose (1/8%) pilocarpine may constrict the tonic pupil due to cholinergic denervation supersensitivity. A normal pupil will not constrict with the dilute dose of pilocarpine. CT scans and MRI scans may be useful in the diagnostic testing of focal hypoactive reflexes.

Treatment
The usual treatment of a standardised Adie syndrome is to prescribe reading glasses to correct for impairment of the eye(s). Pilocarpine drops may be administered as a treatment as well as a diagnostic measure. Thoracic sympathectomy is the definitive treatment of diaphoresis, if the condition is not treatable by drug therapy. Specialist prosthetic contact lenses can also be used to limit light entering the eye

Prognosis
Adie's syndrome is not life-threatening or disabling. As such, there is no mortality rate relating to the condition; however, loss of deep tendon reflexes is permanent and may progress over time.

Epidemiology 
It most commonly affects younger women (2.6:1 female preponderance) and is unilateral in 80% of cases. Average age of onset is 32 years.

Culture 
Modern analysis of Leonardo da Vinci's Mona Lisa suggests that the subject had Adie syndrome.

See also 
 Ciliary ganglion
 Ross' syndrome

References

Further reading 

 

de Campos, D., Coutinho Rodrigues, D., & Buso, L. (2021). The Holmes-Adie Syndrome in the Mona Lisa of Leonardo da Vinci (1452-1519) [JB]. Acta Biomedica Atenei Parmensis, 92(5), e2021305. https://doi.org/10.23750/abm.v92i5.10355

External links 

Neurological disorders
Syndromes affecting the eye
Syndromes affecting the nervous system
Human pupil